The Insheim Geothermal Power Station is a geothermal power station in Rhineland-Palatinate.

The Power Station is related to earthquakes, the strongest had a magnitude of 2.4 and was registered on the 09.April.2010 10:52:22. Until 18.June.2020 154 earthquakes were registered in Insheim. However, there are more earthquakes related to Insheim, one of the strongest occurred on 20.May.2020 with a magnitude of 2.2. The Upper Rhine Plain has a high seismic risk and is home to the BASF, one of the biggest chemical factories in Europe.

References

External links

7

Geothermal energy in Germany
Geothermal power stations in Germany
Geological hazards
Seismology